Marina Pierro (born 9 October 1956, or 1960) is an Italian actress, model, writer, and film director, who is best known for her artistic relationship with Polish filmmaker Walerian Borowczyk (1923-2006). Pierro and Borowczyk's collaboration lasted approximately ten years and comprised five completed films and one foray into episodic television.

Pierro has been described as an "erotic icon of auteur cinema" and she has referred to herself as Walerian Borowczyk's muse. Michael Brooke, a writer specializing in European cinema and an enthusiast of Borowczyk's films, has suggested the importance of Pierro in evaluating the director's work:

For Redeemer magazine in 1993, Peter Tombs wrote,

Of her relationship with Borowczyk, Pierro herself stated,

Early life, meeting Borowczyk, and Behind Convent Walls

Marina Pierro was born in Boscotrecase in the Campanese region of Italy. Various sources give 1956 and 1960 as the year of her birth.

Pierro spent her childhood and adolescence in Turin where her family had moved a few years after Pierro's birth. At an early age, Pierro showed talent in drawing and painting, which led her to artistic studies. Pierro followed photography and theatre courses; studied French; had interests in astrology, esotericism, and psychoanalysis; and maintained a passion for cinema and acting. While studying drawing and painting at Turin's Accademia Albertina, Pierro performed in theatre.

Pierro moved to Rome and began a career in modelling, doing fashion spreads for magazines such as Harper's Bazaar and Vogue Italia, whilst looking  for film work. Pierro's film career began with minor roles in several Italian films in 1976, most notably Luchino Visconti's final film, L'innocente (The Innocent). Pierro got the part after meeting Visconti's assistant, Albino Cocco, whilst walking through Cinecittà studios in Rome: "Visconti's assistant, a friend, introduced me to his boss who was looking for a young girl to play a lady companion, a secondary role, but of great importance to me. On a professional and private level, Visconti was unrivalled in all fields."

Pierro subsequently appeared on the cover of the 9 December 1975 issue of Cinema d'oggi (Cinema Today), introduced as "The latest cinematographic discovery by Luchino Visconti." After appearing in The Innocent, Pierro gave an interview in which she stated,

Pierro mentioned she was going to appear alongside James Mason and Luciana Paluzzi in a film by Allen Reisner titled Greenhouse Flower, but this project never eventuated. She played a maid in the 1976 film I prosseneti (The Panderers), written and directed by Brunello Rondi (an Italian screenwriter and film director best known for his frequent collaborations with Federico Fellini). Pierro played an assistant physiotherapist in Alfredo Rizzo's comedy Sorbole... che romagnola (1976) and a newlywed in the 1976 Italian/Spanish sex comedy Taxi Love, servizio per signora (a.k.a. Taxista de senoras), directed by Sergio Bergonzelli on location in Pescara. Pierro appeared in Dario Argento's supernatural horror film Suspiria (1977) as an uncredited extra before her first prominent role, as the self-styled stigmatic nun Sister Veronica in Walerian Borowczyk's 1977 film Interno di un Convento (Behind Convent Walls), based upon Stendhal's Promenades dans Rome (1829). Of Borowczyk casting her in the film, Pierro recalled,

Borowczyk told Pierro that, as a fan of Italian Renaissance painters, he found in her "the classic Italian figure." Pierro was greatly affected by the experience of meeting Borowczyk and appearing in Behind Convent Walls:

Meeting Pierro had a significant effect on Borowczyk's career as well. Borowczyk cast Pierro in almost all of his subsequent feature films, and it has been noted that Pierro effectively supplanted Borowczyk's wife Ligia Branice, who had appeared in her husband's Goto, Island of Love (1968) and Blanche (1971) as well as Behind Convent Walls. David Thomson wrote,

Similarly, Kuba Mikurda (director of the 2018 documentary film Love Express: The Disappearance of Walerian Borowczyk) wrote,

According to Peter Tombs,

Immoral Women and The Strange Case of Dr Jekyll and Miss Osbourne

Working again with Borowczyk, Pierro played the Renaissance artist Raphael's treacherous mistress Margherita Luti in "Margherita," the first episode of the 1979 triptych anthology film Héroïnes du Mal (Immoral Women), a quasi-sequel to Borowczyk's 1973 erotic anthology film Contes immoraux (Immoral Tales). Taking place in early 16th century Rome, "Margherita" begins with Raphael (François Guétary) spying on Margherita - a baker's daughter - making love with her fiancé, Tomaso (Gérard Falconetti). While posing for a painting at Raphael's studio, Margherita is spied upon by the wealthy banker, Bernardo Bini (Jean-Claude Dreyfus). After Raphael pierces his eye with a paint-brush, Bini sets out to seduce Margherita and, tempting her with jewels, have her poison Raphael with drugged cherries. Ultimately, Margherita takes advantage of Bini and Raphael's sexual obsession with her, outwitting both men before returning with Bini's jewels to her true love, Tomaso.

According to Pierro, Immoral Women strengthened the public association between herself and Borowczyk:

Portraying Margherita as a doe-eyed femme fatale outwitting the men around her, Pierro spends most of her time in Immoral Women either naked or dressed in flimsy, transparent veils, and engaged in graphic sex scenes. Pierro later admitted,

Premiering in March 1979, Immoral Women drew mixed to negative reviews, although Marina Pierro's performance received praise. Reviewing Immoral Women for L'Express, Michel Braudeau wrote,

Describing Immoral Women as "a surreal masterpiece and possibly Borowczyk's finest work" in the online film journal Senses of Cinema in 2005, Scott Murray wrote, "Marina Pierro, having now replaced Ligia Branice (Goto, l’île d’amour, Blanche, etc.) as the director's muse, glows in her finest performance." Describing Margherita as a femme fatale, Murray wrote,

Pierro's third film with Borowczyk was the 1981 horror film Docteur Jekyll et les femmes (a.k.a. Dr Jekyll and his Women, Blood of Dr Jekyll, and Bloodbath of Dr Jekyll). In Borowczyk's radical interpretation of Robert Louis Stevenson's Dr Jekyll and Mr Hyde, Pierro in a co-leading role plays Fanny Osbourne (named after Stevenson's real-life wife), the fiancée of Dr Henry Jekyll (Udo Kier) and essentially an original character on the part of Borowczyk and Pierro. According to Pierro, it was the character of Fanny Osbourne that prompted Borowczyk to make the film:

Borowczyk intended his film to be titled Le cas étrange de Dr. Jekyll et Miss Osbourne (The Strange Case of Dr Jekyll and Miss Osbourne) and this was its title during production. Borowczyk's film - set in 19th century London - details the murder and debauchery that takes place in the home of Dr Henry Jekyll on the night of Jekyll and Fanny Osbourne's engagement party. By immersing himself in a bath filled with a chemical cocktail, Jekyll physically transforms to his alter ego, Mr. Hyde (Gérard Zalcberg). Hyde has none of Jekyll's restrictions of morality and he proceeds to rape, torture, and murder various guests, male and female alike. The story has a twist ending of sorts when Fanny finally discovers her fiancé's secret.

The film's extreme violence ensured it would run afoul of the censors of the time, but Pierro - a fan of horror films - believes the violence was justified by the narrative:

Docteur Jekyll et les femmes was shot in four weeks, a shorter time than had been planned, owing to budgetary issues. Swiss actor Howard Vernon, who appeared in the film as Jekyll's scientific rival Dr Lanyon, later claimed, "Borowczyk was very much in love with the leading actress, Marina Pierro, an Italian girl." Udo Kier recalled in 2015, "Marina... I haven't seen her for a long time...but she was a beautiful, beautiful woman...beautiful body... I think that Marina, she worked a lot with Borowczyk, he taught her a lot because they knew each other quite well. I think of all the people [in the film], she was directed the most."

Of her castmates and experience of the film shoot, Pierro herself recalled,

Of co-star Patrick Magee, Pierro recalled,

The book Borowczyk: Cinéaste Onirique was released in conjunction with Docteur Jekyll et les femmes in 1981 and included a preface by Borowczyk's friend, the French Surrealist writer André Pieyre de Mandiargues, who wrote,

Pierro herself was quoted in the book, stating,

Pierro's face was utilized prominently in advertising of Docteur Jekyll et les femmes, including its trailer and posters; however, the title of the film itself became a source of contention, as Pierro has remarked:

Docteur Jekyll et les femmes won Walerian Borowczyk the award for "Best Feature Film Director" at the 1981 Sitges Film Festival. However, the film did not receive a theatrical release in America and it ran in Great Britain for only one week, without a press screening. The film was relatively obscure in the years following its release but it has enjoyed increasing critical esteem as part of renewed interest in the works of Walerian Borowczyk, and is often cited as one of the director's best films. A restored version of Docteur Jekyll et les femmes was released by Arrow Films in 2015 as The Strange Case of Dr Jekyll and Miss Osbourne, reflecting Borowczyk's preferred title and the importance of Pierro's character in the narrative.

The Living Dead Girl and Art of Love

In 1982, Pierro had a notable role in cult filmmaker Jean Rollin's French horror film La Morte Vivante (The Living Dead Girl) as Hélène, the friend and blood-sister of the titular character (played by Françoise Blanchard). Blanchard's character, Catherine Valmont, is a recently deceased heiress who returns from the dead with an insatiable appetite for human blood; Pierro's character Hélène, initially repulsed, decides to procure human victims for her undead friend.

Pierro had met Rollin briefly at the 1981 Sitges Film Festival, where Docteur Jekyll et les femmes was shown in competition and Rollin's film Fascination was also screening. The following year, Rollin was looking to cast the role of Hélène in The Living Dead Girl, and a friend suggested Pierro for the part. Rollin later stated that Pierro had a fiery temperament that was good for her character. Interviewed in 2002, Pierro's co-star Françoise Blanchard recalled,

Pierro herself recalled,

The Living Dead Girl was relatively successful and won a prize at Italy's Fanta Film Festival the year after its release in 1982. Also in 1982, Pierro appeared in the Italian television miniseries La quinta donna (starring Klaus Maria Brandauer, Turi Ferro, and Aurore Clément) and posed in a nude photoshoot for an issue of the Italian edition of Playboy magazine.

Pierro's fourth film with Borowczyk was the 1983 Italian/French co-production Ars Amandi (Art of Love). In this film - based upon the writings of Ovid - Pierro plays Claudia, wife of the Roman commander Macarius (Michele Placido) in Augustan Rome. While her husband is in Gaul, Claudia takes as her lover Ovid's young student Cornelius (Philippe Taccini). The film's coda takes place in the present day, with Pierro playing Claudine Cartier, a young archaeologist en route from Rome to Paris. Doing publicity for the film, Pierro stated, "Art of Love gives women a true sensuality, at least equal to that of men... Macarius symbolizes moral order and I symbolize free love."

The film had a troubled production involving conflict between Borowczyk and the film's producers: a misunderstanding led to the addition of hardcore scenes during post-production, which caused trouble with the Italian film censors. Advance publicity for Art of Love was not good: the film  represented France in the San Sebastián International Film Festival in September 1983, but going into general release the following month, the film was a commercial flop. Pierro, however, has contended Art of Love is one of Borowczyk's best films; upon the film's UK home video release in 1993, Pierro pointed out how its humour has been overlooked:

Following Art of Love, Borowczyk intended to make a film about the Egyptian queen Nefertiti starring Pierro. According to Pierro, Borowczyk was passionate about the project after he discovered a resemblance between Pierro and a bust of the queen. Borowczyk delivered a press conference on the subject of the film and scouted filming locations in Tunisia, and Pierro discussed the film in interviews:

The Neferiti project was aborted during pre-production, and Pierro took some time off films to appear in avant-garde theatre in Rome. She also spent time writing pieces for theatre as well as a screenplay loosely inspired by Joseph Sheridan le Fanu.

Love Rites and "Un traitement justifié"

In 1987, Pierro appeared in an episode of Carlo Di Carlo's television miniseries Cinque storie inquietanti. She then starred in Walerian Borowczyk's final feature-length film, 1987's love poem Ceremonie d'amour (Love Rites) as Miriam Gwen, a sultry, mysterious and philosophical prostitute who meets and lures the vain and naive clothes buyer Hugo (Mathieu Carrière) in the Paris Métro before seducing and torturing him. The film is based on the novel Tout disparaîtra (Everything Must Go) by André Pieyre de Mandiargues, whose 1967 novel La Marge was adapted to film by Borowczyk in 1976, and who provided the foreword to the 1981 book Borowczyk: Cinéaste Onirique.

Regarding her role in Love Rites, Pierro stated,

Pierro also stated,

Love Rites screened out of competition at Le Festival international du film fantastique d'Avoriaz in 1988 and enjoyed commercial success in Italy, where it was released as Regina della Notte (Queen of the Night). The film was not as successful in France; Borowczyk accused the film's executive producer, Alain Sarde, of promoting the film insufficiently after Borowczyk did not deliver the hardcore product Sarde wanted. In 2005, Cult Epic Films released Love Rites on DVD, an edition containing two versions of the film: the 97-minute "complete" version released to theatres, and Borowczyk's 87-minute director's cut. (Both cuts are included in the film's 2021 Blu-ray release by Kino Lorber.) Love Rites represented the only occasion in which Pierro played a modern-day character for the entirety of a Borowczyk film; her previous roles for the director were all set in historical periods of the past, excepting the conclusion of Art of Love.

However, Borowczyk and Pierro returned to a period setting for what turned out to be their final collaboration: "Un traitement justifié", an episode of the French-German erotic television series Softly from Paris (a.k.a. Série rose). Filmed in 1989 and first broadcast on 3 February 1990, Pierro plays an adulterous wife, Bianca (or Blanche) in an episode adapted from the fifth tale of the seventh night in Giovanni Boccaccio's 14th century collection The Decameron. A jealous, middle-aged husband (Witold Heretynski) disguises himself as a priest, and hears his wife Bianca's confession: she tells him she loves a priest who comes to her every night. The husband posts himself at the door to watch for the priest; meanwhile, Bianca takes advantage of a gap in the wall to bring her young lover - the next-door neighbor, who is not a priest - into her house for erotic encounters.

Kuba Mikurda wrote that "Un traitement justifié" is "effectively [Borowczyk's] last film" and likened it to the director's 1971 film Blanche, which starred Ligia Branice:

Short films, writings, and personal life

Pierro's appearances on screen have been fleeting since the late 1980s, but she has directed three short films since - In Versi (2008, also starring), Himorogi (2012, also writer/producer), and Floaters (2016, also writer/producer). Pierro said, "Walerian knew that one day I would move on to directing, at least I hoped, and he encouraged me."

In Versi is a 25-minute film starring Pierro and is set in the library of the Abbey of Saint Scholastica, Subiaco. Himorogi is a 17-minute homage to Walerian Borowczyk that features allusions to his films as well as an electroacoustic music by Bernard Parmegiani, who had provided music for Docteur Jekyll at les femmes three decades before. The film was co-directed by Pierro's son, professional artist Alessio Pierro, who was also the cinematographer of all three of Pierro's short films. In his official website, Alessio Pierro describes Borowczyk as "an exceptional teacher" who was important for his formation by exploring various techniques of cinema and painting with him. Marina Pierro's 9-minute film Floaters is a portrait of Alessio Pierro.

Himorogi was presented at the 2012 Rome International Film Festival. It is also included as an extra feature in Arrow Films' Blu-ray release of The Strange Case of Dr Jekyll and Miss Osbourne; another feature of the release is a video interview Marina Pierro recorded in 2015, recounting her decade-long collaboration with Borowczyk.

In 2009, Pierro's book Nubi Ardenti (Fiery Clouds) was published by Cupressus. The book is a selection of poems written by Pierro between 1976 and 2009. Pierro has stated she is writing a book titled Ali d’inchiostro (Wings of Ink) about "the artistic path" that united her and Borowczyk, and she is also working on a film project based on a story by Gustav Meyrink. When asked why she does not act anymore, Pierro replied,

Despite her prominence in Borowczyk's filmography, Pierro is not seen or referred to in HBO Europe's feature-length documentary Love Express: The Disappearance of Walerian Borowczyk (2018), which ignores the 1977-1985 period of Borowczyk's career and the films therein (most of which 
Borowczyk made with Pierro). Nevertheless, Pierro has remained a staunch defender of Borowczyk, stating,

On her official Instagram account on 3 October 2021, Pierro posted public opposition to Italy's "Green Pass" (certificazione verde), a digital or paper certificate showing that the holder has been vaccinated, tested negative or recovered from COVID-19.

On Instagram on 3 November 2021, Pierro posted photographs of herself attending a "No Green Pass" rally at Rome's Piazza del Popolo with the message "La libertà esiste se esistono uomini liberi" ("Freedom exists if there are free men").

Filmography

References

External links
 
 Marina Pierro at Flixster
 Marina Pierro at LoveFilm.com
 Official Site

1960 births
Living people
Italian actresses